Andrew McLaren (24 January 1922 – 14 December 1996) was a Scottish professional footballer who played as an inside forward. He was on the books of a number of teams in The Football League.

Career
He started as a youth player with Preston North End in 1937, serving on the ground staff at Deepdale with Tom Finney and playing with him in the B team. He played for Preston in the Football League War Cup in 1940–41 when they won the league and cup. He served in the army during the war, with some service in Egypt.

In 1947 he played in four international matches for Scotland, scoring four goals.

He was found dead alone at his home in Chorley. Police believed that he had been dead for some days before his body was discovered. He was estranged from his wife at the time of his death.

International goals
Scotland score first

Personal life
McLaren's father George was also a footballer.

A collection of McLaren's medals and a team photograph were featured on the ITV antiques-based television programme Dickinson's Real Deal in 2018 after being found during a property renovation. They were subsequently sold at auction for £1000.

References

External links

1922 births
1996 deaths
Sportspeople from Larkhall
Scottish footballers
Scotland international footballers
Association football inside forwards
Preston North End F.C. players
Burnley F.C. players
Sheffield United F.C. players
Barrow A.F.C. players
Bradford (Park Avenue) A.F.C. players
Southport F.C. players
Rochdale A.F.C. players
Fleetwood Town F.C. players
English Football League players
Larkhall Thistle F.C. players
Footballers from South Lanarkshire
Scottish Junior Football Association players
Hamilton Academical F.C. wartime guest players